Westview may refer to:

Places

Canada 
 Westview Village, Edmonton, a neighbourhood
 Westview, British Columbia, a community and ferry terminal
 Westview, Saskatoon, a neighbourhood
 Westview, Saskatchewan

United States 
 Westview, Florida
 Westview, Atlanta, Georgia, a historic neighborhood southwest of downtown
 Westview, Illinois
 Westview, Indiana
 Westview, Maryland, a suburb of Baltimore
 Westview (Brookneal, Virginia), a historic plantation house and farm

Media
 Westview (album), a 2011 album by Monkey Majik
 Westview Press, an American academic publisher
 Westview, New Jersey, a fictional town depicted in the 2021 TV series WandaVision

See also
 West View (disambiguation)
 Westview High School (disambiguation)
 Westview School (disambiguation)